The 2015–16 Davidson Wildcats women's basketball team will represent Davidson College during the 2015–16 college basketball season. The Wildcats, led by sixth year head coach Michele Savage. The Wildcats are second year members of the Atlantic 10 Conference and play their home games at the John M. Belk Arena. They finished the season 11–19, 5–11 in A-10 to finish a 4-way tie for tenth place. They lost in the first round of the A-10 women's tournament to Richmond.

2015–16 media

Davidson Wildcats Sports Network
Select Wildcats games will be broadcast on Teamline with Derek Smith and Leslie Urban providing the call. Most home games will also be featured on the A-10 Digital Network. Select games will be televised.

Roster

Schedule

|-
!colspan=9 style="background:#BA0000; color:#000000;"| Non-conference regular season

|-
!colspan=9 style="background:#BA0000; color:#000000;"| Atlantic 10 regular season

|-
!colspan=9 style="background:#BA0000; color:#000000;"| Atlantic 10 Women's Tournament

Rankings
2015–16 NCAA Division I women's basketball rankings

See also
 2015–16 Davidson Wildcats men's basketball team

References

Davidson Wildcats women's basketball seasons
Davidson
Davidson Wildcats women's basketball
Davidson Wildcats women's basketball